The inauguration of Martin Van Buren as the eighth president of the United States took place on Saturday, March 4, 1837, at the East Portico of the United States Capitol in Washington, D.C. This was the 13th inauguration and marked the commencement of the only four-year term of both Martin Van Buren as president and Richard Mentor Johnson as vice president. Vice President and President-elect Van Buren rode with his predecessor Andrew Jackson in a small phaeton built from the wood of  drawn by four gray horses. This was the first time that the outgoing and incoming president rode together to the Capitol. Van Buren would become the last sitting vice president to be inaugurated as president through an election until George H. W. Bush in 1989.

The event proved less a celebration of the incoming president than a tribute to the outgoing one. Van Buren's inaugural address took wistful note of it:

With a single exception, the new administration retained Jackson's entire cabinet, and Van Buren pledged to "tread generally in the footsteps of President Jackson."

See also 
Presidency of Martin Van Buren
1836 United States presidential election

References

External links 

More documents from the Library of Congress
Text of Van Buren's Inaugural Address

United States presidential inaugurations
1837 in American politics
1837 in Washington, D.C.
Inauguration
March 1837 events